Dangote Industries Tanzania Thermal Power Station, is a , natural-gas powered thermal power plant in Tanzania, the second-largest economy in the East African Community.

Location
The geographical coordinates of the power plant are: 10°15'33.0"S, 40°02'27.0"E (Latitude:-10.259167; Longitude:40.040833).

Overview
The power station is owned and operated by  Dangote Industries Tanzania Limited. It is located adjacent to the US$500 million cement factory, owned by the Dangote Group. The power plant supplies electricity to the cement factory as well as the residential and commercial development complex around the factory. , the cement factory was under construction, with commissioning expected in 2015. When fully operational, the factory is expected to produce 3 million tonnes of cement every year. Dangote Cement is the largest manufacturer of cement on the African continent, producing approximately 47 million metric tonnes annually as of November 2014.

Conversion to natural gas
In August 2018, Dangote Industries Tanzania signed a 20-year agreement with the Tanzania Petroleum Development Corporation, for the latter to supply readily available natural gas to this power station, for the purpose of generating electricity to be used in the manufacture of cement. It is expected that the conversion will be complete by November 2018.

See also

References

External links
  Dangote Cement To Generate Power In Tanzania

Power stations in Tanzania
Mtwara Region
2018 establishments in Tanzania
Energy infrastructure in Tanzania
Energy infrastructure completed in 2018